Leonardo Costa Silva (born 20 April 1995), commonly known as Léo Tilica, is a Brazilian professional footballer who plays as a winger for Greek Super League club Asteras Tripolis.

References

1995 births
Living people
Brazilian footballers
Grêmio Foot-Ball Porto Alegrense players
Clube Atlético Tubarão players
Sociedade Esportiva e Recreativa Caxias do Sul players
Asteras Tripolis F.C. players
Association football forwards
Campeonato Brasileiro Série A players
Campeonato Brasileiro Série C players
Campeonato Brasileiro Série D players
Super League Greece players
Brazilian expatriate footballers
Expatriate footballers in Greece
Brazilian expatriate sportspeople in Greece
People from São Luís, Maranhão
Sportspeople from Maranhão